The 1953 Manitoba general election was held on June 8, 1953 to elect Members of the Legislative Assembly of the Province of Manitoba, Canada. The election produced a majority government for the Liberal-Progressive party led by Douglas Campbell. His party won thirty-two of fifty-seven seats although with but 39 percent of the vote overall. To date this is the last election in which the Liberal Party won a majority of seats in Manitoba. 

This was the first election held in Manitoba after the breakup of a ten-year coalition government led by the Liberal-Progressives and Progressive Conservatives.  The coalition, which began in 1940, was ended in 1950 when the Progressive Conservatives crossed to the opposition side.

Prior to the 1949 election, Winnipeg's single at-large 10-member district was broken up into three four-member districts. The new districts were named Winnipeg Centre, Winnipeg North and Winnipeg South, to elect four members each, through STV. St. Boniface elected two members through STV. (The 1953 election was to be the last provincial election in Manitoba to have multi-member districts and election by STV, because after that election all MLAs in Manitoba were elected through First-past-the-post voting in single-member districts.)

The other districts elected one MLA by Instant-Runoff Voting. This was to be the last provincial election in Manitoba to use Instant-Runoff Voting in these districts.

The result of the election was a convincing victory for the Liberal-Progressive government of Premier Douglas Campbell, which won thirty-two of fifty-seven seats although with but 39 percent of the vote overall.

Three Independent Liberal-Progressives were also elected.

The Progressive Conservatives, led by Errick Willis, saw their representation in the legislature increase from nine to twelve members.  This was a disappointing result for many in the party.  Willis had been a prominent cabinet minister in the coalition government, and many questioned the sincerity of his new-found opposition to Campbell's ministry.  The following year, he lost the leadership of the party to Dufferin Roblin.

The social democratic Co-operative Commonwealth Federation (CCF) suffered a disappointment under new leader Lloyd Stinson, falling from seven seats to five. Its 17 percent of the vote made it due about eight seats proportionally.

During the campaign, the Winnipeg Free Press newspaper devoted considerable attention to the return of the Social Credit Party in Manitoba.  The party had not contested the previous provincial election, but was buoyed by the recent Social Credit victory in British Columbia and ran several candidates.  The Free Press, which supported the Liberal-Progressives, and played up the threat of a Social Credit victory to rally popular support for the government.  The actual threat posed by Social Credit was minimal: only two of its candidates were elected, although it did receive 13 percent of the vote.

The Communist Labor-Progressive Party also won representation in the legislature, with party incumbent Bill Kardash taking one of the four constituency seats in Winnipeg North.  This was the last time that a Communist candidate won election to the Manitoba legislature, or indeed to any provincial legislature in Canada.

Two independent candidates were elected. Stephen Juba, the mayor of Winnipeg, was one of them.

Results

See also
 List of Manitoba political parties

Constituency results

Single-member constituencies

Arthur:

Assiniboia:

First Count

Fournier and Bloomfield were eliminated, and their votes were distributed as follows:  Wightman 837, Mackling 768.  600 votes were non-transferable.

Final Count

Birtle:

Brandon City:

First Count

Wyborn was eliminated, and his votes were distributed as follows: Lissaman 272, Creighton 138.  646 votes were non-transferable.

Second Count

Carillon:

Cypress:

First Count

Ferg was subsequently declared elected on transfers from Philippe.

Dauphin:

First Count

Bullmore was subsequently elected on transfers.

Deloraine-Glenwood:

Dufferin:

First Count

McDonald was subsequently elected on transfers from Collins.

Emerson:

First Count

Solomon was subsequently declared elected on transfers from Friesen.

Ethelbert:

Fairford:

First Count

Joseph H. Kacher entered the contest as an Independent Liberal-Progressive, but withdrew before election day.  Anderson was subsequently elected on transfers.

Fisher:

Gilbert Plains:

First Count

Brown and Elliott were eliminated, and their votes were transferred as follows: Mitchell 239, Wilson 222.  614 votes were non-transferable.

Final Count

Gimli:

Gladstone:

Hamiota:

First Count

Charles was eliminated, and his votes were distributed as follows: Venables 123, Shuttleworth 88.  314 votes were non-transferable.

Second Count

Iberville:

First Count

Hilgenga and Rempel were eliminated, and their votes were distributed as follows: Jarvis 207, McDowell 195.  637 votes were non-transferable.

Final Count

Kildonan—Transcona:

First Count

Although Melnyk ran as an independent, he was supported by the local Progressive Conservative association.

Both Carson and Melnyk were eliminated after the first count.  Paulley received 275 additional votes on transfers, while Bodie received 163.  It is assumed that all of these transfers came from Melynk's total, and that Paulley was declared elected before Carson's ballots were scrutinized.  For the purposes of this article, Carson's final vote total is listed under "votes not transferred".

Second Count

Killarney:

First Count

Harrison was subsequently elected on transfers from Paterson.

Lakeside:

Lansdowne:

First Count

Sutherland was subsequently elected on transfers from Doherty.  The Winnipeg Free Press of June 12, 1953, indicates that Sutherland had 2,160 votes on the second count.

La Verendrye:

Manitou-Morden:

First Count

Morrison was subsequently elected on transfers from O'Donnell.

Minnedosa:

First Count

Hutton was subsequently elected on transfers from Burgess.

Morris:

First Count

Tinkler was eliminated, and his votes were distributed as follows: Shewman 432, Beaubien 58.  354 votes were not transferred.

Second Count

Mountain:

Norfolk-Beautiful Plains:

First Count

Nelson was eliminated, and his votes were distributed as follows: McKinnon 342, Burch 257.  766 votes were not transferred.

Portage la Prairie:

First Count

Rempel was eliminated, and his votes were transferred as follows: Warren 200, Greenlay 94.  490 votes were non-transferable.

Rhineland:

Roblin:

Rockwood:

Russell:

First Count

Clement was subsequently elected on transfers.

St. Andrews:

St. Clements:

Fred Klym entered the contest as an Independent Liberal Progressive candidate, but withdrew before election day.

St. George:

Halldorson was also supported by the St. George Progressive Conservative Association.

Springfield:

First Count

Watt was eliminated, and his votes were distributed as follows: Storsley 206, Lucko 128.  309 votes were not transferred.

Swan River:

First Count

Renouf was subsequently elected on transfers.

The Pas:

Turtle Mountain:

Virden:

Eric Bailey was nominated for the Social Credit Party, but withdrew before election day.  Herman Scheel was nominated in his place, but also withdrew after discovering that some electors who had signed his nomination papers believed they were endorsing Bailey.

Multi-member constituencies

St. Boniface
Two members elected

Valid votes in total  = 19,557

Quota (amount that ensures election but not necessary to be elected)   = 6,519

At the end there were 3954 exhausted votes, votes that were no longer in play, either because there were no back-up preferences marked or because the candidates that were marked had already been eliminated.

Two Liberal-Progressive candidates were declared elected when the field of candidates narrowed through eliminations of lowest-ranking candidates to the point where these two were the last remaining candidates to fill the two seats, which had still not been filled by that point.
Being the last ones remaining, they were elected even though they did not have quota.

Winnipeg Centre

The surpluses of Swailes and Juba were not transferred, as they were too small to affect the final candidate order.  Scott was declared elected to the fourth position, despite finishing below the quota.

Winnipeg North

Kardash and Turk were declared elected to the third and fourth positions, even though both finished below the quota.

Winnipeg South

Stinson's surplus of 146 was not transferred, as it would not have affected the candidate order.

Deferred elections

The election in Rupertsland was deferred to July 6, due to the difficulties of enumeration in this vast northern constituency.  The election in Ste. Rose was also deferred to July 6, after incumbent Liberal-Progressive candidate Maurice Dane MacCarthy died on the eve of the general election.

The election did not technically end until July 21, 1953, when the final results for Rupertsland were announced.

Rupertsland (deferred to July 6, 1953):

First Count

The Progressive Conservatives initially nominated E.G. Perry, but he withdrew from the contest and endorsed Brown.  Brown was declared elected following transfers from Abbott.  The official Elections Manitoba report of this constituency lists Boulette as an official Liberal-Progressive candidate, but newspaper reports from the period indicate that he was an Independent Liberal-Progressive.

Ste. Rose:

First Count

Pineau was eliminated, and his votes were transferred as follows: Molgat 192, Fletcher 83.  616 votes were not transferred.

Second Count

Sources

Results for the first ballot counts for all constituencies are taken from the 1954 Canadian Parliamentary Guide, and from Election Manitoba's "Historical Summaries" (printed as an appendix to the 2003 election results).

There are minor discrepancies between these sources for the Social Credit vote count in Brandon City, Manitou-Morden, Rockwood and Swan River.  The sources also disagree as to the candidate order for Minnedosa on the first count (although both agree that Gilbert Hutton was subsequently elected).  In each case, the "Historical Summaries" entry has been taken as more reliable.

All results after the first ballot are taken from reports in the Winnipeg Free Press.  This paper made an obvious error in reporting Lloyd Stinson's fifth-vote count, which has been corrected here.  Other than this, the results for multi-member constituencies may be taken as accurate and verifiable.  For the single-member constituencies, it possible that Free Press reports differed from the final results in some particulars.

Post-election changes

Ivan Schultz (Mountain, LP) resigned his seat in the first half of 1955, while James O. Argue (Deloraine-Glenwood, PC) died in the same period.  By-elections for both constituencies were held on June 27, 1955.  The CCF concluded that it did not have a chance of victory in either seat, and declined to nominate candidates.  Social Credit also planned to stay out of the elections, until Roger Poiron entered the Mountain poll without consulting the provincial party.  Although not technically an official candidate, he still received support from the Social Credit organization.

The Winnipeg Free Press's coverage indicates that the Campbell government was concerned with the results of the 1955 by-elections.  Mountain had previously been regarded as one of the safest Liberal-Progressive seats in the province, and Boulic's performance was unexpectedly strong.  Many leading government figures had campaigned for Clark in the campaign's final days, to ensure his victory.  Clark received most of his support from Mountain's Anglo-Saxon majority and large Flemish community, while Boulic did well among French Canadians, who made up about one third of the voters.

St. George (dec. Christian Halldorson, 1956), December 30, 1956:
Elman Guttormson (LP) 1214
Magnusson (PC) 707
Allen (CCF) 510

Emerson (res. John Solomon, 1957), November 14, 1957:
John Tanchak (LP) 2183
Frank Casper (PC) 2008

[Note: These figures are taken from the Winnipeg Free Press, with 31 of 32 polls reporting.  The outstanding poll was too small to affect the final result.]

Manitou-Morden (dec. Hugh Morrison, 1957), November 14, 1957:
Maurice Ridley (PC) 2240
David Lumgair (L) 1057

Gladstone (dec. William Morton, early 1958)

Dauphin (William Bullmore left the Social Credit party in either 1957 or 1958)

Arthur (dec. J. Arthur Ross, April 1, 1958)

Further reading

References

Manitoba
1953 General
General election
Manitoba general election